AAPA may refer to:

 Aboriginal Areas Protection Authority, a statutory body protecting sacred sites in the Northern Territory, Australia
 American Academy of Physician Associates, the organization representing physician assisistants in the United States
 American Association of Physical Anthropologists, an American-based international scientific society of physical anthropologists
 American Association of Port Authorities, a trade association
 American Association of Public Accountants, former name of the American Institute of Certified Public Accountants
 Asian American Political Alliance, a political organization in the 1960s aiming to unite all Asian Americans to push for political change
 Association Against the Prohibition Amendment, a leading organization working for the repeal of prohibition in the United States
 Association of Asia Pacific Airlines, a trade association
 Association of Authorised Public Accountants, a British professional body for public accountants
 Australian Aboriginal Progressive Association (1924–1927), an Aboriginal advocacy body based in Sydney, Australia
 Australian Airline Pilot Academy, see Wagga Wagga Airport#Pilot academy